AV Linux is a Linux-based operating system aimed for multimedia content creators. Available for the i386 and x86-64 architectures with a kernel customized for maximum performance and low-latency audio production, it has been recommended as a supported Linux platform for Harrison Mixbus.

Environment 
Originally made with remastersys, AV Linux is built on top of MX Linux.

Versions before, and including, version 6 were 32-bit only, running a 32-bit Linux kernel with the IRQ threading and rtirq-init patches activated by default. For computers with more than 4 GB of RAM, a PAE version was made available.

From AV Linux 2016 onward, there are both 32-bit and 64-bit versions available.

as of version 6.0.2, Window management is handled by the Xfce Desktop Environment. While previous versions used the LXDE Desktop Environment.

It is possible to boot AV Linux from either a live CD or a hard drive. Advanced Audio playback and routing is handled by JACK, while ALSA is used for basic audio operation.

Software 
AV Linux is bundled with software for both everyday use and media production.

As of AV Linux 2016, AV Linux gets its software packages from the KXStudio repositories, which are compatible with Debian, and therefore AV Linux. This reduces duplication of effort and allows the effort focus to be on a solid base distribution suitable for audio production.

For this reason, AV Linux 2016 development has focused more on the base distribution than bundling it with large amounts of software, as it did with previous versions. Instead, the 2016 edition leaves it up to the users to decide what they want to install from the large repository of software available via KXStudio.

Audio 
Preinstalled audio software includes: Ardour, Audacity, Calf Studio Gear, Carla, Guitarix, Hydrogen and MuseScore.

Graphics 
Preinstalled graphics programs include: GIMP, Inkscape and Shotwell.

Video 
Preinstalled software for video editing, playback, capture and 3D animation include: Blender, Cinelerra, Kdenlive and Openshot.

Everyday use 
For typical day-to-day activities there are several programs available including Firefox and LibreOffice Suite.

Manual 
A Manual was provided by the maintainer of AV Linux, Glen MacArthur, This manual provides users with "84 illustrated pages of FAQ’s and important Operational details".

Reception
LinuxInsider: "The modified (Xfce) menus add a big element of ease to finding your most frequently used apps. The menu hierarchy uses a two-tiered design. This drastically cuts down on the need to rummage through long cascading menu lists"

LinuxJournal: "AV Linux Control Panel... provides easy access to tools and utilities for system management, administration, and customization. Its amenities include an installer for ATI/nVidia binary video drivers and a very useful tool that scans and analyzes your system for its readiness for realtime performance."

ZDNet: "Everything in AV Linux is aimed at reducing the operating system overhead, and leaving as much of the processing power as possible available for the multimedia editing applications."

Softpedia Linux: "As mentioned before, the distribution provides users with a large collection of video and audio production software, ranging from simple audio and video players to sophisticated video editors and CD rippers. Additionally, it comes with a patched Linux kernel package that allows for low-latency audio performance. The Live DVD can be used as-is or installed on a local disk drive."

Also review was written by InfoWorld.

References

External links 

AVLinux at DistroWatch
LMP: The Advantages of Choosing an Audio Orientated Linux Distribution

Debian-based distributions
Linux media creation distributions
Free audio software
Free music software
Free video software
Free graphics software
Linux distributions